The Equatorial Guinean passport is issued to citizens of the Equatorial Guinea for international travel.

As of 1 January 2017, Equatorial Guinean citizens had visa-free or visa on arrival access to 46 countries and territories, ranking the Equatorial Guinean passport 89th in terms of travel freedom (tied with Central African Republic passport) according to the Henley visa restrictions index.

Languages
The data page/information page is printed in Spanish.

See also 
 List of passports
 Visa requirements for Equatorial Guinean citizens

References

Passports by country
Government of Equatorial Guinea